Montserrat have competed at each of the last nine Commonwealth Games, making their first appearance in 1986 mixed badminton . They have not won a medal, and the sports in which they have participated is Badminton & Athletics.

References
 Official results by country

 
Nations at the Commonwealth Games